The People's Liberation Army Hong Kong Garrison is a garrison of the People's Liberation Army (PLA), responsible for defence duties in the Hong Kong Special Administrative Region (SAR) since the sovereignty of Hong Kong was transferred to China in 1997. Prior to the handover of Hong Kong, the territory was under British rule, and the defence of the territory was the responsibility of the British Forces Overseas Hong Kong, with auxiliary help from the Royal Hong Kong Regiment.

The garrison is headquartered in Chinese People's Liberation Army Forces Hong Kong Building in Central, Hong Kong. The  size of the Hong Kong garrison is approximately 10,000–12,000 personnel including members of the People's Armed Police.

Role in Hong Kong 

The People's Republic of China (PRC) assumed sovereignty over Hong Kong on 1 July 1997 and the Central People's Government (CPG) stationed a garrison of the People's Liberation Army (PLA) in Hong Kong to manage the defense affairs of the territory. While the garrison has been considered primarily symbolic of Beijing's governance over Hong Kong, it is nevertheless asserted to be combat-ready force.

The Basic Law upon the territory provides that the CPG shall be responsible for the defense of Hong Kong and shall bear the expenditure for the garrison, whereas the colonial Hong Kong Government before 1997 had to pay for the military. The Garrison Law, subsequently enacted by the National People's Congress, contains specific provisions on the duties and rules of discipline of the garrison personnel, jurisdiction and other questions, to facilitate the Hong Kong Garrison in fulfilling its defence functions along legal lines. Military forces stationed in Hong Kong shall not interfere in the local affairs and the Hong Kong government shall be responsible for the maintenance of public order. The Garrison formally stationed in Hong Kong assumed defence responsibility for Hong Kong starting midnight on 1 July 1997.

The Hong Kong Garrison includes elements of the People's Liberation Army Ground Force, PLA Navy, and PLA Air Force; these forces are under the direct leadership of the Central Military Commission in Beijing and under the administrative control of the adjacent Southern Theater Command.

While performing its defense duties, the Hong Kong Garrison must abide by both national and Hong Kong laws, as well as the current rules and regulations of the PLA, according to the Garrison Law, a PRC law. After its entry into Hong Kong, the Hong Kong Garrison abide by the Basic Law and the Garrison Law, actively organizing military training. According to the Garrison Law, the Garrison established working contacts with the Hong Kong Government, and opened the barracks on Stonecutters Island and Stanley to the public to promote Hong Kong people's understanding of and trust in the garrison forces and their personnel. Annual open house events are held to showcase the assets and combat readiness of the garrison personnel. Garrison troop rotations are routine and usually are accompanied by numbers, but the August 2019 and last years rotations lacked any language to that effect. 

In early 2022, Chairman of the Central Military Commission Xi Jinping, appointed Major General Peng Jingtang, a former People's Armed Police paramilitary commander, to lead the PLA garrison in Hong Hong.

Insignia 
Personnel in the Hong Kong Garrison wore uniforms different from their mainland counterparts until a new set of uniforms were introduced in 2007. Motor vehicles in the military are right-hand drive, like civilian vehicles in Hong Kong, and carry number plates that start with ZG, standing for zhùgǎng, Chinese for "[stationed] in Hong Kong."

Command 

The Hong Kong Garrison reports to both the Southern Theater Command and Central Military Commission in Beijing, and informs Hong Kong Government of any actions within or around Hong Kong.

 Garrison Commanders
 Lt. General Liu Zhenwu 1997–1999 (appointed 1994)
 Lt. General Xiong Ziren 1999–2003
 Lt. General Wang Jitang 2003–2007
 Lt. General Zhang Shibo 2007–2012
 Lt. General Wang Xiaojun 2012–2014
 Lt. General Tan Benhong 2014–2019
 Maj. General Chen Daoxiang 2019–2022
 Maj. General Peng Jingtang 2022–present

 Political Commissars
 Maj. General Xiong Ziren 1997–1999
 Maj. General Wang Yufa 1999–2003
 Maj. General Liu Liangkai 2003–2005
 Lt. General Zhang Rucheng 2005–2007
 Lt. General Liu Liangkai 2007–2010, second term
 Lt. General Wang Zengbo 2010–2012
 Lt. General Yue Shixin 2012–2018
 Maj. General Cai Yongzhong 2018–present

Properties 

There are 19 sites occupied by the Garrison across Hong Kong. According to a Reuters investigation, many of these sites are run down and not fully utilised, which has caused some to argue that the land should be returned and used for housing. The Tsing Shan firing range occupies approximately 80% of the 2,750 hectares of land managed by the PLA.

A secret 20th site was discovered in 2014, without the PLA informing the public, as required by the Garrison Law.

The Commander lives on The Peak at Headquarters House, 11 Barker Road. Other property owned by the Garrison includes the United Services Recreation Club.

Army

Regiments/Units 
 Infantry Garrison Brigade (Air Assault) (Unit 53300)
Formerly the 1st Red Regiment of 1st Red Division, 1st Red Army. In 1949, the regiment comprised the 424th Regiment, 142nd Division, 48th Army. In 1952, the 142nd Division was assigned to 55th Army and the 424th Regiment renamed the 430th Regiment. In 1970, the 144th Division was renamed as the 163rd Division and 430th Regiment renamed as 487th Regiment.
 PLA Hong Kong Garrison Honour Guard Battalion
 3 infantry battalions (Air Assault/Heliborne)
 1 mechanized infantry battalion
 1 artillery battery
 1 engineer battalion
 1 reconnaissance/special ops company (named 5-min Response Unit, some of them later transferred to the Macau Garrison to form the a new Quick Reaction Platoon there)
 1 intelligence gathering battalion
 1 Armour Convoy
 1 Logistics Base, Shenzhen. (Unit 53310)
 1 Motor Transport Company, Shao Fei

Bases 
Bases within Hong Kong are former British facilities namely from the British Army:
 Central Barracks – PLA Ground Force – formerly HMS Tamar
 Ching Yi To Barracks – formerly part of Victoria Barracks and renamed from Queen's Lines Barracks
 Kowloon East Barracks – formerly Osborn Barracks
 Stanley Barracks – PLA Ground Force – home of 5-min Response Unit
Chek Chue Barracks
 Western Barracks –  88 Bonham Road– formerly Bonham Tower Barracks
 Stonecutter Barracks – PLA Navy
 Shek Kong Airfield, Shek Kong Barracks – PLA Air Force.
 Northern Compound – formerly Borneo Lines
 Southern Compound – formerly Malaya Lines
 San Tin Barracks – formerly Cassino Lines
 Tam Mei Barracks – Ngau Tam Mei in Yuen Long
 Gallipoli Lines – Sha Tau Kok Road in Fanling, formerly San Wai Camp
 San Wai/Tai Ling Range
 Burma Lines - also known as Queen's Hill Camp
 Gun Club Hill Barracks Kowloon – home to PLA Garrison Hospital

Equipment

Navy 
The naval presence in Hong Kong is a limited sub-station with a small flotilla of ships rotating from bases in the mainland China:

Squadrons 
 Squadron 38081 – a naval squadron of the South Sea Fleet

Bases 
 Stonecutter's Island (Ngong Shuen Chau Naval Base) – formerly HMS Tamar
 Tai O Barracks, Shek Tsai Po – formerly Naval Coastal Observation Station, Tai O

Fleet 
Various ships of the People's Liberation Army Navy visit the base, but only a few ships remain on semi-permanent basis.

Air Force

Units 
 1 helicopter squadron (PLAAF # 39968) at local Shek Kong Airbase
 1 fighter squadron at Guangdong Airbase

Bases 
PLA Hong Kong Garrison has three airbases, with two of these within Hong Kong:

 Shek Kong Airfield, Hong Kong
 Shadi Air Base, west of Guangzhou, Guangdong
 Joint Movement Unit, Chek Lap Kok – Hong Kong International Airport, Hong Kong

Aircraft Inventory

See also 
 Macao Garrison
 British Forces Overseas Hong Kong

References

External links 

  
 PLA in Hong Kong
 PLA in Hong Kong – China Defence 

People's Liberation Army Ground Force
 
Military of Hong Kong
Southern Theater Command
Guangzhou Military Region
1997 establishments in Hong Kong